The Hueco Rock Rodeo is a bouldering competition held annually in February at Hueco Tanks State Historic Site in the extremities of El Paso, Texas. It is highly competitive and attracts professional rock climbers from all over the world.  The proceeds go toward conservation and access.  The extreme competition was not the original intention of the event but with the growing popularity of bouldering, it has turned into one of the most difficult and coveted competitions to win.  After 20+ years it is still a mainstay in the climbing community and is as much a festival as it is a serious competition.

History
The following are excerpts from Rock and Ice magazine by Melissa Strong on the early history of the event:

"In 1989 the El Paso Climbers Club (EPCC) started the Rock Rodeo before any restrictions came into place at Hueco Tanks.  Dave Head remembers fondly some of the early Rodeos: “We would get Croakies and give them out—then the next few weeks you would see all of the people at Hueco wearing their Croakies. It was simple back then. There were trophies, velvet Elvis posters and the most injured climber got a bottle of tequila.”  For six years the Rodeo continued to attract up to 150 participants including Dale Goddard, Hans Florine and Matt Samet. There were some changes in the Rodeo’s format because of ongoing access issues due to over use and vandalized pictographs, but the Rodeo went on still hosted by the EPCC and held at Pete’s. In 1995, due to continuing problems, the Rodeo was suspended. In 1996 the Rodeo continued, but was called the 7th Rock Rodeo. The 8th and 9th Rock Rodeo occurred before the Public Use Plan (PUP) was put into place in 1998. After the PUP went into effect, the Hueco Rock Rodeo tradition was put on hold in 1999, 2000, 2001, and 2002.  In 2003 Rob Rice appealed to the park and was able to put on the 10th annual Rock Rodeo–the first Rodeo hosted by the Rock Ranch."

Format 
The format has changed over the 20+ years of competition but the modern era standards (2012–present) are fairly consistent.

Each year the event organizers dictate a location where the separate categories will compete.  Usually the location changes every year.

Typically there are four main categories:
Recreational: V0-V4
Intermediate: V3-V7
Advanced: V5-V10
Masters (ages 40+): V0-V14
Open:V7-V14

In previous years the "Open" category was referred to as the "Mutant" category.

In the specified location a scorecard containing a list of boulder problems is given to the competitors.  From this list the competitors must successfully climb the boulder problem without falling and have two witnesses sign the scorecard to receive the allocated point value for the climb.  Attempts are recorded in the event of a tie.  The top 6 problems are taken as the total score.

Scores for each boulder problem are related to the "V-Scale".  V7 may equal 700pts.  So if a competitor has an overall score of 6000 then they may have climbed 6 V10 boulders.

The coveted Open category is one of the most competitive with the winner receiving a rodeo style belt buckle, cash prize, and international recognition.

Men's results

Women's results

Masters' Results

References

Sports competitions in Texas
Tourist attractions in El Paso County, Texas
Climbing competitions